Fabienne Schauss (born 1 September 1984) is a road cyclist from Luxembourg. She participated at the 2011 UCI Road World Championships. She was on the start list of 2018 Cross-Country European Championships and finished 22.

References

External links
 profile at Procyclingstats.com

1984 births
Luxembourgian female cyclists
Living people
Place of birth missing (living people)